The 2010–11 Football League Championship (known as the npower Championship for sponsorship reasons) was the seventh season of the league under its current name and nineteenth season under its current league division format. It started on 6 August 2010 and concluded on 7 May 2011, with the resultant play-offs concluding with the final on 30 May.

Queens Park Rangers secured the Championship title on 30 April 2011, ending their 15-year hiatus from the Premier League, while Norwich City secured the second automatic promotion spot two days later, ending a six-year absence from the top flight. Swansea City won the play-off final to take the final promotion place.

Preston North End, Scunthorpe United and Sheffield United were relegated to League One.

Changes from last season

Team changes

From Championship
Promoted to Premier League:
 Newcastle United
 West Bromwich Albion
 Blackpool

Relegated to League One:
 Peterborough United
 Plymouth Argyle
 Sheffield Wednesday

To Championship
Relegated from Premier League:
 Burnley
 Hull City
 Portsmouth

Promoted from League One:
 Norwich City
 Leeds United
 Millwall

Rule changes

Off-field rules
 New financial reporting rules see transfer embargoes imposed on those clubs which fail to lodge their accounts with the Football League, at the same time they are required by Companies House.
 The Football League's fit and proper person test was renamed the Director's Test to ensure continuity with other football bodies.

Sponsorship changes
After Coca-Cola's sponsorship contract expired and was not renewed, Npower signed a three-year contract to become the Football League's official partner. The Coca-Cola Player of the Month and Coca-Cola Manager of the Month awards are therefore now known as the Npower Player of the Month and the Npower Manager of the Month award respectively.

Team overview

Stadia and locations

Personnel and sponsoring

1Middlesbrough's sponsors include: Deepdale Solutions (7 – 30 August), Wiring Services (1–30 September), Ramsdens (1 October – 5 March), Marie Curie Cancer Care (6–8 March)

Managerial changes

Ownership changes

League table

Play-offs

Semi-finals

Swansea City won 3 – 1 on aggregate.

Reading won 3 – 0 on aggregate.

Final

Results
The fixtures for the Championship were released on 17 June 2010. The season kick-off was announced for 6 August 2010 and it concluded on 7 May 2011.

Season statistics

Top scorers

Top assists

Hat-tricks

Scoring
First goal of the season: John Eustace for Watford against Norwich City (6 August 2010)
Highest scoring game: 10 goals – Leeds United 4–6 Preston North End (28 September 2010)
Most goals scored in a game by one team: 6 goals
 Millwall 1–6 Watford (18 September 2010)
 Portsmouth 6–1 Leicester City (24 September 2010)
 Leeds United 4–6 Preston North End (28 September 2010)
 Doncaster Rovers 0–6 Ipswich Town (15 February 2011)
 Norwich City 6–0 Scunthorpe United (2 April 2011)
Widest winning margin: 6 goals
 Doncaster Rovers 0–6 Ipswich Town (15 February 2011)
 Norwich City 6–0 Scunthorpe United (2 April 2011)
Fewest games failed to score in: 5 – Norwich City
Most games failed to score in: 21 – Scunthorpe United

Discipline
Most yellow cards (club): 86 – Leeds United
Most yellow cards (player): 12
 Robbie Savage (Derby County)
Most red cards (club): 13 – Sheffield United
Most red cards (player): 2
 Matthew Connolly (Queens Park Rangers)
 Claude Davis (Crystal Palace)
 Alan Dunne (Millwall)
 Marlon King (Coventry City)
 Shane Lowry (Sheffield United)
 Dean Moxey (Derby County & Crystal Palace)
 Ricardo Rocha (Portsmouth)
 Jamie Ward (Sheffield United & Derby County)
 Lee Williamson (Sheffield United)
Most fouls (club): 554 – Leeds United
Most fouls (player): 103 – Grant Holt (Norwich City)

Clean sheets
Most clean sheets: 25 – Queens Park Rangers
Fewest clean sheets: 4 – Preston North End

Monthly awards

Team of the year

{| class="sortable" border="2" cellpadding="4" cellspacing="0" style="text-align:center; margin: 1em 1em 1em 0; background: #f9f9f9; border: 1px #aaa solid; border-collapse: collapse; font-size: 95%;"
|-
!class="unsortable" |Position
!class="unsortable" width=170px|Name
!class="unsortable" |Club
|-
| GK
| Paddy Kenny
| Queens Park Rangers
|-
| RB
| Kyle Naughton
| Leicester City
|-
| CB
| Wes Morgan
| Nottingham Forest
|-
| CB
| Ashley Williams
| Swansea City
|-
| LB
| Ian Harte
| Reading
|-
| RM
| Adel Taarabt
| Queens Park Rangers
|-
| CM
| Andy King
| Leicester City
|-
| CM
| Wes Hoolahan
| Norwich City
|-
| LM
| Scott Sinclair
| Swansea City
|-
| ST
| Grant Holt
| Norwich City
|-
| ST
| Danny Graham
| Watford

References

  
EFL Championship seasons
1
2
Eng